Alpinia elegans is a species of flowering plants in the ginger family, Zingiberaceae. It is found in Asia (the Philippines, Indonesia).

References 

 Alpinia elegans at The Plant List
 Alpinia elegans at Tropicos
 Alpinia elegans at GBIF

elegans
Plants described in 1899